Paduka Sri Sultan Muhyiddin Mansur Shah ibni al-Marhum Sultan Rijaluddin Muhammad Shah (died 4 January 1662) was the 14th Sultan of Kedah. His reign was from 1652 to 1662. He established his capital at Kota Sena in 1654. He accepted Siamese suzerainty and dispatched the first "Bunga Mas" in September 1660.

External links
 List of Sultans of Kedah

17th-century Sultans of Kedah
1662 deaths